Hadena filograna is a species of moth of the family Noctuidae. Subspecies filograna is found from central and southern Europe to Anatolia. The most northern part of the range is Sweden. Subspecies conspargata is found in Ukraine and from southern Russia to the Altai mountains and ssp. rungsi is found in North Africa.

Description
The wingspan is 30–35 mm. Warren states H. filigrama Esp. (= filograna Esp., filigramma Frr., flavivibica Hbn.) (18f). Like magnolii, but the forewing dusted with ferruginous scales; the type form is brown, like magnolii, in ground colour, without white admixture, and is restricted in range, occurring, authentically, only in the Mts. of S. Hungary.

Subspecies
Hadena filograna filograna
Hadena filograna conspargata
Hadena filograna rungsi

Biology
Adults are on wing from May to June.

The larvae feed on Silene nutans and Silene vulgaris.

References

External links
Lepiforum e.V.
schmetterlinge-deutschlands.de 

Hadena
Moths of Europe
Moths of Africa
Moths of Asia